Olivia Rawlinson (born 26 October 1992) is a swimmer from the Isle of Man. She competed mainly in the 200 m freestyle and medley events.

She represented the Isle of Man at the 2006 Commonwealth Games, becoming their youngest participant ever in the Commonwealth Games. Rawlinson made her international debut in the Shetland Island Games in 2005 where she competed in eight races, winning a medal in every race. Her main aim is to compete in the 2012 Summer Olympics in London or the 2016 Summer Olympics. Rawlinson competed in the 2007 Natwest Island Games where she performed at an extremely high level, winning eight medals, three silver and five bronze. This was followed by four golds and three silver in the 2009 games in Aland. Although Rawlinson qualified for the 2010 Delhi Commonwealths, she has given up swimming to focus on other things.

She was nominated for the Isle of Man sports awards in February 2008.

References

1992 births
Living people
Manx swimmers
Female medley swimmers
Commonwealth Games competitors for the Isle of Man
Swimmers at the 2006 Commonwealth Games